Don P. Brandon (born c. 1941) is an American retired college baseball head coach and former college athlete. He coached at Anderson University in Indiana for 38 seasons.

Biography
Brandon served as head coach of the Anderson Ravens baseball team in 1972 and from 1974 to 2010. He recorded 1,110 wins and 588 losses, for a  winning percentage. He led the Ravens to 13 conference titles, 12 NAIA District titles, 5 NAIA World Series appearances (1984, 1987, 1993, 1998, and 2003) and the 1991 National Christian College Athletic Association National Championship.

Brandon attended Anderson University and Ball State University, where he earned degrees in 1963 and 1967, respectively. He later earned a doctorate at Springfield College in Massachusetts in 1976. While a student at Anderson, Brandon earned varsity letters in baseball and football, and also played on the basketball team. Anderson's baseball coach at that time was former Brooklyn Dodgers player Carl Erskine.

Brandon first coached at Anderson in 1968, as an assistant with the football and basketball teams. He later was an assistant baseball coach under Erskine. Brandon served as head coach of the baseball team in 1972, with Erskine coaching a final season in 1973. Brandon then was head coach from 1974 through 2010.

Born in Vinemont, Alabama, Brandon graduated from high school in Cullman, Alabama, in 1959. He was inducted to the Cullman County, Alabama, Sports Hall of Fame in 2011, and the Anderson University Athletic Hall of Fame in 2010. Brandon married in 1962; he and his wife have two children.

See also
 List of college baseball coaches with 1,100 wins

References

Year of birth missing (living people)
Living people
People from Cullman County, Alabama
People from Anderson, Indiana
Anderson Ravens baseball coaches
Anderson Ravens basketball coaches
Anderson Ravens football coaches
Anderson Ravens baseball players
Anderson Ravens men's basketball players
Anderson Ravens football players
Ball State University alumni
Springfield College (Massachusetts) alumni